Huodendron parviflorum is a species of flowering plant in the family Styracaceae. It is endemic to Vietnam.

References

Styracaceae
Endemic flora of Vietnam
Trees of Vietnam
Vulnerable plants
Taxonomy articles created by Polbot
Taxobox binomials not recognized by IUCN